Singers Glen Historic District is a national historic district located at Singers Glen, Rockingham County, Virginia. The district encompasses 65 contributing buildings and 2 contributing sites in the village of Singers Glen.  The district retains much of its late 19th-century air and most of its
original buildings. Notable buildings include the Glen Farm (John S. Funk House, c. 1889), The Solomon Funk Farm (c. 1857), Edwin E. Funk House (Gray House, 1892), Swank Store and Post Office (c. 1890), T. Funk and Sons Store (1895), The Carriage Works (1826), Singers Glen Baptist Church (1888), United and Methodist Church (1895, 1905). Located in the district is the separately listed Joseph Funk House.

It was listed on the National Register of Historic Places in 1978.

References

Historic districts in Rockingham County, Virginia
Gothic Revival architecture in Virginia
Queen Anne architecture in Virginia
National Register of Historic Places in Rockingham County, Virginia
Historic districts on the National Register of Historic Places in Virginia
Pennsylvania Dutch culture in Virginia